Orya is a genus of centipedes belonging to the family Oryidae. Centipedes in this genus range from 5 cm to 22 cm in length, have about 81 to 125 pairs of legs, and are found in northwest Africa and the Iberian penninsula.

Species
Species within this genus include:
 Orya almohadensis
 Orya barbarica
 Orya panousei
 Orya voeltzkowi

References

Centipede genera
Geophilomorpha
Taxa named by Frederik Vilhelm August Meinert